Alfred Henry Grunwald ["Stretch"] (February 13, 1930 – January 18, 2011) was an American professional baseball pitcher. He played parts of two seasons in Major League Baseball in 1955 and 1959. He also played one season in Nippon Professional Baseball in 1962.

He was born in Los Angeles.

Grunwald was a first baseman in the minor leagues for the first five years of his professional career, before converting to pitcher. He hurled for the Pittsburgh Pirates during the 1955 season and with the Kansas City Athletics in 1959. He lost his only decision, giving up four runs on 25 hits and 18 walks while striking out in 19 innings of work.

Grunwald also played 13 minor league seasons between 1947 and 1961, including stints in Mexico and Japan, and returned to first base duties during his final two seasons. He posted a 41-31 record and a 3.96 ERA in 160 pitching appearances. As a hitter, he collected a .295 average with 111 home runs and a slugging of .469 in 1392 games.

Grunwald died in Chatsworth, California, at the age of 80.

Sources

1930 births
2011 deaths
American expatriate baseball players in Canada
American expatriate baseball players in Japan
American expatriate baseball players in Mexico
Baseball players from Los Angeles
Billings Mustangs players
Columbus Jets players
Davenport Pirates players
Hollywood Stars players
Indianapolis Indians players
Kansas City Athletics players
Leesburg Pirates players
Little Rock Travelers players
Major League Baseball pitchers
Mexican League baseball pitchers
New Orleans Pelicans (baseball) players
Pittsburgh Pirates players
San Francisco Seals (baseball) players
Santa Rosa Pirates players
Shreveport Sports players
Taiyō Whales players
Tigres del México players
Toronto Maple Leafs (International League) players
Waco Pirates players
John C. Fremont High School alumni